COMM domain-containing protein 1 is a protein that is encoded by the COMMD1 gene in humans.  It was originally regarded as Murr1 before being differentiated and renamed by Dr. Ezra Burstein's Lab

References

External links

Further reading